The Azerbaijan Democratic Party was a pro-Soviet, separatist, and pan-Turkist party founded by Jafar Pishevari in Tabriz, Iran, in September 1945. It depended on the Soviet Union and was supported by it. The ADP was founded as an opposition party against the Pahlavi dynasty. The Soviet-supported Tudeh Party dissolved its Azerbaijan chapter and ordered its members to join the ADP. The ADP ruled the Soviet-backed Azerbaijan People's Government from 1945 until 1946 with Pishevari as premier.

See also
 Iran crisis of 1946
 Anglo-Soviet invasion of Iran

References 

Affiliated organizations of the Tudeh Party of Iran
Defunct communist parties in Iran
Ethnic political parties
Iran–Soviet Union relations
Formerly ruling communist parties
Political parties of minorities in Iran
1945 establishments in Iran
Political parties established in 1945
Pan-Turkist organizations
Separatism in Iran